This is a list of associate judges of the New York Court of Appeals, with their tenure on the court.

Associate judges serving before 1870

Associate judges serving between 1870 and 1974

Associate judges serving since 1974

See also
 List of chief judges of the New York Court of Appeals
 Judiciary of New York
 New York Constitution
 Government of New York  state 
 Court of Appeals of New York

References

 
Albany, New York
New York Court of Appeals list
Justices
New York

no:New York Court of Appeals